Supaksorn Nuntana (born 8 December 1989) is a Thai racing cyclist, who currently rides for UCI Women's Continental Team . She competed in the 2013 UCI women's road race in Florence.

Major results
2015
Track Clubs ACC Cup
1st Individual pursuit
2nd Points race
3rd Individual pursuit, Asian Track Championships
Track Asia Cup
3rd Keirin
3rd Team sprint (with Pannaray Rasee)
2016
2nd Individual pursuit, Track Clubs ACC Cup

References

External links
 

1989 births
Living people
Supaksorn Nuntana
Place of birth missing (living people)
Cyclists at the 2018 Asian Games
Supaksorn Nuntana
Supaksorn Nuntana